Sündü (also, Syundi and Syundyu) is a village and municipality in the Gobustan Rayon of Azerbaijan.  It has a population of 2,682.

References 

Populated places in Gobustan District